This is the discography of Hiphop Tamizha, an Indian musical duo consisting of Adhi and Jeeva.

Studio albums

Singles

Film scores and soundtracks 

All the films are in Tamil, unless otherwise noted.

Television

Web series

As a singer

Music video appearances

Song list

2010s

2020s

References 

Discographies of Indian artists